Centro de Estudios Tecnológicos en Aguas Continentales (CETAC) is a chain of Mexican high schools (known in Mexico as ) which offers programs to upgrade the regular degree to a technical-professional level. CETAC has campuses in two states.

All CETAC and CETMAR high schools are part of the technical school of the Educación en Ciencia y Tecnología del Mar (DGECyTM) and are dependents of Secretaría de Educación Pública.

Location
There are two CETAC in México

See also
 CBTA (Centro de Bachillerato Tecnológico Agropecuario)
 CBTF (Centro de Bachillerato Tecnológico Forestal)
 CBTIS (Centro de Bachillerato Tecnológico Industrial y de Servicios)
 CEB (Centro de Estudios de Bachillerato)
 CETIS (Centro de Estudios Tecnológicos Industrial y de Servicios)
 CETMAR (Centro de Estudios Tecnológicos del Mar)
 PFLC (Preparatoria Federal Lázaro Cárdenas)
 PREFECO (Preparatoria Federal por Cooperación)

References

External links
DGECTM

High schools in Mexico